Sözen is a Turkish surname. Notable people with the surname include:

 Edibe Sözen, Turkish politician
 Fatih Sözen, German footballer
 Melisa Sözen, Turkish actress
 Nurettin Sözen, Turkish physician
 Umut Sözen, Turkish footballer
 Metin Sözen, Turkish architect

Turkish-language surnames